These are regular season standings for the current incarnation of the American Basketball Association (ABA).  

Note:  The ABA does not keep official records for team standings.  These records were all taken from www.USBasket.com.

2000-2001

2000-01 ABA season

2001-2002

2001-02 ABA season

2002-2003

No Season

2003-2004

2003-04 ABA season

2004-2005

See 2004-05 ABA season

2005-2006

See 2005-06 ABA season

2006-2007

See 2006–07 ABA season

2007-2008

See 2007–08 ABA season

2008-2009

See 2008–09 ABA season

2009-2010

See 2009–10 ABA season

2010-2011

See 2010–11 ABA season

2011-2012

See 2011-12 ABA season

2012-2013

See 2012-13 ABA season

2013-2014

See 2013-14 ABA season

2014-2015

See 2014-15 ABA season

American Basketball Association (2000–present)
American Basketball Association (2000–present) events